Marcelo Dias Jucá (born 18 September 1963 in Rio de Janeiro) is a former international freestyle swimmer from Brazil.

Jucá participated in the 1980 Summer Olympics, in Moscow, where he swam the 400-metre and 1500-metre freestyle, not reaching the finals.

Participated at the 1982 World Aquatics Championships in Guayaquil, where he finished 7th in the 4×200-metre freestyle final, 10th in the 1500-metre freestyle, and 22nd in the 400-metre freestyle. The conditions were adverse in Ecuador. Ricardo Prado gave a statement to a Brazilian newspaper, telling the situation: "The hotel we stayed at was not well attended. It was directly across the Guayaquil bus station. I managed to reach the final of the 200-metre individual medley, but I was weak because food there was terrible, and finished the race in eighth place." Prado landed at home with gold in the neck and a big mycosis in the belly. Djan Madruga had worse luck: he contracted typhoid.

At the 1983 Summer Universiade, in Edmonton, he finished 4th in the 400-metre and 1500-metre freestyle, and 8th in the 100-metre butterfly.

He was at the 1983 Pan American Games, in Caracas. He won two silver medals in the 1500-metre and 4×200-metre freestyle, and won the bronze medal in the 400-metre freestyle. He also finished 7th in the 100-metre butterfly.

At the 1984 Summer Olympics in Los Angeles, Jucá finished 9th in the 4×200-metre freestyle, 12th in the 4×100-metre medley, 15th in the 400-metre freestyle, and 17th in the 1500-metre freestyle.

Jucá was at the 1985 Pan Pacific Swimming Championships, the first edition of the competition, where he finished 6th in the 400-metre freestyle, and 8th in the 200-metre butterfly.

At the 1985 Summer Universiade, in Kobe, he finished 4th in the 400-metre freestyle. At this competition, Jucá broke the Brazilian record of the 100-metre butterfly, which belonged to Ricardo Prado, with a time of 56.19 seconds. This was the only Brazilian record that Jucá possessed throughout his life.

References

External links 
 
 

1963 births
Living people
Brazilian male freestyle swimmers
Swimmers at the 1980 Summer Olympics
Swimmers at the 1983 Pan American Games
Swimmers at the 1984 Summer Olympics
Olympic swimmers of Brazil
Pan American Games silver medalists for Brazil
Pan American Games bronze medalists for Brazil
Pan American Games medalists in swimming
Medalists at the 1983 Pan American Games
Swimmers from Rio de Janeiro (city)
20th-century Brazilian people
21st-century Brazilian people